The 12th International Gold Cup was a Formula Two motor race, held on 18 September 1965, at Oulton Park, Cheshire. The race was run over 40 laps of the circuit, and was won by John Surtees in a Lola T60. Denny Hulme in a Brabham BT16 started from pole position, set joint fastest lap with Jim Clark and finished second. Graham Hill was third in a Lotus 35. Only six-tenths of a second covered the first three finishers.

Results

References

Formula Two races
International Gold Cup
International Gold Cup